Torsten de Winkel (born 6 January 1965) is a German musician, composer, and philosopher primarily active in the jazz, world music, fusion and electronic music genres. He is known as an electric and acoustic guitarist but also records and performs on electric sitar, keyboards, and percussion. Since the 1990s, he has initiated and participated in several platforms aimed at combining the arts and sustainability.

Biography
At the age of 10, de Winkel picked up the Charango in La Paz, Bolivia where his father worked for the UN. He proceeded to teach himself guitar and jazz improvisation and attended the Hoch Conservatory in Frankfurt, Germany for a brief period.

For the release of Mastertouch, he collaborated with Michael Brecker, Billy Cobham, Kai Eckhardt, Ernie Watts, Alphonse Mouzon, Hellmut Hattler, Joachim Kühn and various other instrumentalists, setting a new standard for young musicians both in regard to its open minded eclecticism and to its high level of transatlantic musical cooperation, subsequently followed by many younger artists such as trumpeter Till Brönner.

Upon an invitation by Steve Smith and Tom Coster, members of platinum-selling groups Santana and Journey, de Winkel become successor to Mike Stern and Frank Gambale in their co-led jazz-fusion group Vital Information and proceeded to tour internationally with this group. He accepted a full scholarship from the Berklee College of Music in Boston and graduated summa cum laude. In the 1990s, he collaborated with an unusually broad spectrum of artists including Pat Metheny (DVD Secret Story Live), Al Foster, Larry Grenadier, Matthew Garrison, Ravi Coltrane, Joe Zawinul, Grandmaster Flash, and more recently Gwilym Simcock and Stuart Hamm. He can also be heard on all ten CDs of the German vanguard electronica-jazz fusion duo Tab Two and continues to tour and record with Hattler, the group of former Kraan head Hellmut Hattler. This group won the Echo Award, the German equivalent of the Grammy Award, for best jazz album in 2001. Since, he has been active in various projects in Europe, Africa and Asia as well as in non-profit organizations exploring sustainability and globalization issues in the context of the arts.

Disenchanted with the common chord scale theory didactics, de Winkel has developed an alternative approach to teaching improvisation. Under the title Training Intuition this approach considers recent developments in learning psychology and in the neurosciences. De Winkel has conducted courses, master classes and clinics at various institutions, among them the Musikhochschule Hamburg and the Berufsfachschule für Musik in Krumbach/Schwaben. De Winkel is also active in the field of neurophilosophy.

In 2005, Torsten de Winkel was one of the initiators and has since been the artistic director of the Bimbache openART Festival and Initiative in UNESCO world biosphere reserve El Hierro (Spain). This project, based on a global interdisciplinary network of artists and thinkers, is an ambitious and non-profit effort at creating a platform which seeks to bridge traditional divides, both on a musical and human level, in a globalized world.

Books
 Martin Kunzler: Jazz Lexikon. Rowohlt, Reinbek bei Hamburg 2002.

Discography

As leader 
 Mastertouch (EMI, 1985) – with Michael Brecker, Kai Eckhardt, Joachim Kühn, Ernie Watts and others
 Humanimal Talk (veraBra, 1988) – with Hellmut Hattler, Nana Vasconcelos, Joo Kraus and others
 Torsten de Winkel Acoustic Quartet (Hot Wire, 1991) – with Larry Grenadier, Bob Moses and others
 Tribute: Talking to the Spirits (Hot Wire, 1993) – with Larry Grenadier, Bob Moses and others
 Long Time Coming (nyjg, 1996) – with Buster Williams, Al Foster, Ravi Coltrane and others
 New York Jazz Guerrilla – Method to the Madness *part 1 (nyjg, 1998) – with Jacques Schwarz-Bart, Matthew Garrison, Kurt Rosenwinkel and others
 Bimbache Jazz y Raíces: La Condición Humana (nyjg, 2008) – with Gregoire Maret, Gwilym Simcock, María Mérida and others

As sideman
With Hellmut Hattler
 Heartware (Vielklang, 1986)
 Mind Movie (Intercord, 1991)
 No Eats Yes (Polydor / Universal, 2000)
 Remixed Vocal Cuts (Bassball, 2002)
 Mallberry Moon (Bassball, 2003)
 Bass Cuts (Bassball, 2004)
 Surround Cuts (Bassball/36music 2004)
 The Big Flow (Bassball/36music 2006)
 Live Cuts (Bassball/36music, 2007)
 Gotham City Beach Club Suite (Bassball/36music, 2010)
 Live in Glems (Bassball/36music, 2013)
 The Kite (Bassball/36music, 2013)
 Live Cuts II (Bassball/36music, 2014)
 Warhol Holidays (36music/Bassball, 2016)
 Bassball II (Bassball/36music, 2017)
 Velocity (Bassball/36music, 2018)

With Tab Two
 Space Case (Intercord, 1992)
 Hip Jazz (Intercord, 1994)
 Flagman Ahead (Virgin, 1995)
 Sonic Tools (Virgin, 1997)
 Between Us (Polydor, 1999)
 Live at the Roxy (36music, 2012)

With others
 Pat Metheny, Secret Story Live (DVD, LD & VHS)
 D.Kay, Individual Soul (Brigand Music, 2007)
 Alphonse Mouzon, The Sky Is the Limit (Pausa, 1985)
 Steve Smith, Fiafiaga (Celebration) (Columbia, 1988)
 Russ Spiegel, Twilight (Double Moon, 2002)
 Aziza Mustafa Zadeh, Inspiration (Columbia, 2000)
 XXL feat. Grandmaster Flash, El Jazz Latino / The Funky Stuff (Sony)         
 Deep Dive Corp., Beware Of Fake Gurus
 Timo Maas, Lifer (Rockets & Ponies, 2013)
 Kike Perdomo, A World Of Music (with Chano Domínguez, Eric Marienthal and others) / AC&Funk
 Carola Grey, Drum Attack!
 Various Artists, Basstorius (with Matt Garrison)
 Various Artists,Mysterious Voyages – A Tribute to Weather Report (with Scott Kinsey)

References

External links
 

1965 births
Living people
Acoustic guitarists
Berklee College of Music alumni
German composers
German jazz guitarists
Jazz fusion guitarists
Lead guitarists
German male guitarists
German male jazz musicians
Optimism Records artists